Lloyd Evans may refer to:

 Lloyd Evans (athlete) (born 1915), Canadian Olympic runner
 Lloyd Evans (plant physiologist) (1927–2015), New Zealand plant physiologist who made his career in Australia
 Lloyd Evans (rugby player) (born 1990), Welsh rugby union player
 Lloyd Evans (rugby fly-half) (born 1995), English rugby union player